Kløverbladbukta (Clover Leaf Bay) is a bay which cuts into the  peninsula Oxfordhalvøya in Wahlenbergfjorden at Nordaustlandet, Svalbard. The shape of the bay resembles a cloverleaf. At the entrance of the bay are ridges which partly close the bay.

References

Bays of Svalbard
Nordaustlandet